Lulu Belle is a hit 1926 musical directed by David Belasco. Spencer Williams was involved in the production of an adaptation with an African American cast. The 1948 film Lulu Belle was also adapted from the original musical.

The play was written by Edward Sheldon and Charles MacArthur. The four-act play is set in San Juan Hill (an African American section on Manhattan's west side), Harlem, and Paris. One of the settings is a fictional Harlem nightclub called Elite Grotto.

The lead roles of Lulu Belle and George Randall were portrayed by Lenore Ulric and Henry Hull in blackface.

References

External links 
 

1926 films
1920s musical films
American musical films
1920s American films